Eutane terminalis, the banded lichen moth, is a moth of the subfamily Arctiinae. It was described by Francis Walker in 1854. It is known from the Australian states of Queensland and New South Wales.

The wingspan is about 15 mm. Adults are black and yellow.

The larvae feed on lichen. They are dark grey and yellow and reach a length of about 15 mm when full grown. They live communally.

References
Citations

Sources
 

Lithosiini
Moths described in 1854